Maren Kroymann (born 19 July 1949) is a German actress, comedian and singer.

Career 
Kroymann was born in Walsrode. She studied English, Roman studies, and American studies at University of Tübingen. After spending time in Paris and the United States, Kroymann moved to Berlin, where she sang in the Hanns-Eisler Choir. As Nachtschwester Kroymann (1993–1997), she was the first woman in German public television with her own satirical show. In recent years, Kroymann has appeared in a number of German films.

Awards
 2019 Rose d'Or Lifetime Achievement Award
 2019 Grimme Preis for comedy show Kroymann
 2020 Carl-Zuckmayer-Medaille
 2020  (Honorary Award)
 2021 Deutscher Comedypreis for lifetime achievement

Personal life 
Kroymann is gay. In an interview with the German Taz, Kroymann has said that she always wanted people to know that she was a lesbian, but also that she can still play any role that she would be able to play if people didn't know that she was gay, and that it took some time before producers finally accepted the fact that an out lesbian can play straight characters.

Filmography (selection) 

 1986: Wanderungen durch die Mark Brandenburg (Hikes through the March of Brandenburg, based on the travelogue by Theodor Fontane) IMDb
 1988: Oh Gott, Herr Pfarrer (Oh God, Reverend)
 1990: Baldur Blauzahn (Baldur Bluetooth)
 1992: Vera Wesskamp
 1992: Brandnacht (Burning Night)
 1992:  (No Pardon)
 1993–1997: Nachtschwester Kroymann (Night Nurse Kroymann, comedy show)
 1996: The Superwife
 1998: Gisbert
 1998: Der Campus (The Campus)
 1999: Schande (Shame)
 2000: Tatort: Bienzle und das Doppelspiel (Bienzle and the Double Game)
 2001–2007: Mein Leben & Ich (My Life and I)
 2001: Durch dick und dünn (Through Thick and Thin)
 2003: Der Preis der Wahrheit (The Price of the Truth)
 2004: Ein Baby zum Verlieben (A Baby to Fall in Love)
 2004: Tatort: Bienzle und der steinerne Gast (Bienzle and the Guest of Stone)
 2006: Nicht ohne meine Schwiegereltern (Not without my Inlaws)
 2006:  ( Punish Me)
 2007: Pastewka (TV series, guest)
 2008: The Wave
 2009: 
 2009: Horst Schlämmer – Isch kandidiere!
 2010: The Hairdresser 
 2013: Free Fall
 2014: Zu mir oder zu dir?
 2016: Too Hard to Handle
 2017–2021: Kroymann (comedy show)
 2018: Der Junge muss an die frische Luft
 2020: How to Sell Drugs Online (Fast)
 2021: Mutter kündigt (Mother resigns)
 2021: Mona & Marie

References

External links 
 
 

1949 births
Living people
German film actresses
German women singers
German LGBT rights activists
German LGBT singers
German lesbian actresses
German lesbian musicians
Lesbian singers
German television actresses
20th-century German actresses
21st-century German actresses